N96 may refer to:
 Bellefonte Airport, in Pennsylvania, United States
 , a submarine of the Royal Navy
 Nebraska Highway 96, in the United States
 Nokia N96, a smartphone